The 2012 South Ayrshire Council election took place on 3 May 2012 to elect members of South Ayrshire Council. The election used the eight wards created as a result of the Local Governance (Scotland) Act 2004, with each ward electing three or four Councillors using the single transferable vote system form of proportional representation, with 30 Councillors being elected.

The election saw the Scottish Conservative Party remain the largest party on the Council though they lost 2 seats. The Scottish National Party gained 1 seat and replaced the Scottish Labour Party as the second largest party as the party also increased its vote share at the expense of the other parties. Labour retained its 9 seats an achievement as she had suffered 3 defections during 2007-2012. Independents doubled their numbers to 2 seats.

Following the election the Conservative Party formed a minority administration working in a Partnership Agreement with the Labour Party members. Both Independents are also supporting the administration. This replaced the previous Conservative minority administration which existed from 2007-2012.

Election result

Note: "Votes" are the first preference votes. The net gain/loss and percentage changes relate to the result of the previous Scottish local elections on 3 May 2007. This may differ from other published sources showing gain/loss relative to seats held at dissolution of Scotland's councils.

Summary by ward 

|- class="unsortable" align="center"
!rowspan=2 align="left"|Ward
! % 
!Cllrs
! %
!Cllrs
! %
!Cllrs
! %
!Cllrs
! %
!Cllrs
!rowspan=2|TotalCllrs
|- class="unsortable" align="center"
!colspan=2 bgcolor=""| Conservative
!colspan=2 bgcolor="" | SNP
!colspan=2 bgcolor="" | Labour
!colspan=2 bgcolor=""| Independents
!colspan=2 bgcolor="white"| Others
|-
|align="left"|Troon
|39.6
|2
|26.9
|1
|21.0
|1
|12.4
|0
| - 
| -
|4
|-
|align="left"|Prestwick
|38.9
|2
|32.9
|1
|25.9
|1
| -
| -
|2.3
|0
|4
|-
|align="left"|Ayr North
|15.9
|1
|38.2
|1
|45.9
|2
| -
| -
| -
| -
|4
|-
|align="left"|Ayr East
|33.0
|1
|31.4
|2
|23.4
|1
|12.2
|0
| -
| -
|4
|-
|align="left"|Ayr West
|48.2
|2
|25.0
|1
|15.3
|1
|9.3
|0
|2.2
|0
|4
|-
|align="left"|Kyle
|23.5
|1
|28.7
|1
|32.8
|1
|15.1
|0
| -
| -
|3
|-
|align="left"|Maybole, North Carrick and Coylton
|21.3
|1
|30.3
|1
|22.9
|1
|25.6
|1
| -
| -
|4
|-
|align="left"|Girvan and South Carrick
|15.8
|0
|19.7
|1
|17.0
|1
|47.4
|1
| -
| -
|3
|- class="unsortable" style="background:#C9C9C9"
|align="left"| Total
|31.5
|10
|29.3
|9
|25.0
|9
|13.5
|2
|0.7
|0
|30
|-
|}

Ward results

Troon
2007: 2xCon; 1xSNP; 1xLab
2012: 2xCon; 1xLab; 1xSNP
2007-2012 Change: No change

		

* = Sitting Councillor from a different Ward.

Prestwick
2007: 2xCon; 1xSNP; 1xLab
2012: 2xCon; 1xLab; 1xSNP
2007-2012 Change: No change

Ayr North
2007: 2xLab; 1xSNP; 1xCon
2012: 2xLab; 1xSNP; 1xCon
2007-2012 Change: No change

Ayr East
2007: 2xCon; 1xSNP; 1xLab
2012: 2xSNP; 1xCon; 1xLab
2007-2012 Change: SNP gain one seat from Con

Ayr West
2007: 2xCon; 1xSNP; 1xLab
2012: 2xCon; 1xSNP; 1xLab
2007-2012 Change: No change

Kyle
2007: 1xLab; 1xSNP; 1xCon
2012: 1xSNP; 1xLab; 1xCon
2007-2012 Change: No change

Maybole, North Carrick and Coylton
2007: 1xSNP; 1xIndependent; 1xCon; 1xLab
2012: 1xIndependent; 1xLab; 1xCon; 1xSNP
2007-2012 Change: No change

Girvan and South Carrick
2007: 1xCon; 1xSNP; 1xLab
2012: 1xIndependent; 1xSNP; 1xLab
2007-2012 Change: Independent gain one seat from Con

Post-election changes
† Ayr East SNP Cllr Corri Wilson was elected as an MP for Ayr Carrick and Cumnock on 7 May 2015. She resigned her Council seat on 23 June 2015  and a by-election was held on 17 September 2015 and the seat was held by the SNP's John Wallace.

By-elections since 2012

References

2012
2012 Scottish local elections
21st century in South Ayrshire